Cho Pyone (born on 17 November 1946) is a Burmese film actress and singer. She has won multiple Myanmar Motion Picture Academy Awards throughout her career. She has had a prolific film and music career.

Cho Pyone was born Aye Aye Myint in Rangoon, Burma (now Yangon, Myanmar) on 17 November 1946 to Chan Htun and his wife, Kyi Kyi. Her music career debuted with the song "Female Soldier."

Filmography

Films
Ta Kyawt Hna Kyawt Tay Ko Thi (1971)
Aww Main Ma Main Ma (1972)
Chit Thu Yway Mal Chit Wae Lal (1975)
Chit A Mhya (1979)
Moon Tae Chain Twin Nay Win The (1982)
Kyee Yaung Saung Thaw Daung (1985)
Lwan Nay Mal Ma Ma (1986)
A May Chay Yar (1997)
Da Bae Naw (2003)

References

External links
 

Living people
1946 births
Burmese film actresses
People from Yangon
20th-century Burmese women singers
20th-century Burmese actresses